Collix rhabdoneura is a moth in the  family Geometridae. It is found in Malaysia.

References

Moths described in 1941
rhabdoneura